Matthew Warnock (born 3 April 1984) is a former professional Australian rules footballer who played for the Gold Coast Football Club in the Australian Football League (AFL). He began his AFL career playing for Melbourne where he wore the No. 1 guernsey (previously No. 37), and was recruited from the Sandringham Zebras in the Victorian Football League (VFL).

On 17 October 2011, after 55 games with Melbourne, Warnock was traded to Gold Coast in a complex three-team trade that also included the Brisbane Lions.

Statistics
 Statistics are correct as of round 22, 2010 (29 August 2010)

References

External links

Melbourne Football Club players
Gold Coast Football Club players
1984 births
Living people
People educated at Brighton Grammar School
Australian rules footballers from Victoria (Australia)
Casey Demons players
Sandringham Football Club players